Aamund is a Danish surname. Notable people with the surname include:

 Jane Aamund (1936–2019), Danish author and journalist
 Malou Aamund (born 1969), Danish politician and businesswoman, niece of Jane

See also
 Amund

Danish-language surnames